Solomon (Salomo) Rosowsky (1878, Riga –1962) was a cantor (hazzan) and composer, and son of the Rigan cantor, Baruch Leib Rosowsky.

Early life
Rosowsky began to study music only after he graduated from the University of Kyiv, with a degree in law.  Among his teachers at the St. Petersburg Conservatory was Rimsky-Korsakov. Together with the pianist Leonid Nesvishsky (Arie Abilea), the singer Joseph Tomars, the composer Lazare Saminsky, and several other musicians Rosowsky organized the Society for Jewish Folk Music in 1908. In 1918 he became music director of the Jewish Art Theater (GOSET).

Professional career
Rosowsky returned to Riga in 1920 and founded the first Jewish Conservatory there. After a five-year stay, he left for Palestine, where at that time he at first was one of the few professional musicians. The folk music of Palestinian Jews became a major new inspiration for his compositions. Despite the enthusiastic work of the pioneers, the material living conditions in Palestine at that time were still extremely arduous. And for an artist who was used to the rich musical life of St. Petersburg, the land had little to offer in those early days except for a few amateur orchestras and two music schools. However, Rosowsky stayed on. He composed stage music for the workers' theater "Ohel", gave lessons and began his path-breaking research into the music of the Bible, which later made his name known all over the world. He even tried, together with David Schor and David Mirenburg, to continue the concert activities of the New Jewish School, founding the music society "Hanigun".

Later years
His latter years he spent in New York, where he taught at the Cantors' Institute of the Jewish Theological Seminary. His magnum opus, "The Cantillation of the Bible: Five Books of Moses", was published in 1957.

Publications
 "The Cantillation of the Bible: Five Books of Moses", published 1957

See also

Notable Relatives
 Yuri Rasovsky
 Barney Ross
 Baruch Leib Rosowsky

External links
musica-judaica.com, Rosowsky bio
AN INVENTORY OF THE SOLOMON ROSOWSKY COLLECTION, The Library of The Jewish Theological Seminary New York, 1996

1878 births
1962 deaths
Musicians from Riga
People from the Governorate of Livonia
Latvian Jews
Latvian composers
Jewish American composers
Hazzans
Latvian emigrants to Mandatory Palestine
Jewish musicologists
Israeli emigrants to the United States